Maardu United is a football club, based in Maardu, Estonia.

The club also has a reserve team, Maardu United II, which plays in IV Liiga.

Founded in 2014, the club has played in the II Liiga since 2017. After their second forfeit on 29 July 2018, they were disqualified from the league.

Players

Current squad
 As of 2 May 2017.

Statistics

League and Cup

References

External links
 Official website 

Association football clubs established in 2014
Harju County
2014 establishments in Estonia
Football clubs in Estonia